The Madras Rifle Corps was a light infantry battalion in the service of the Honourable East India Company.

History
The battalion was established in the Madras Presidency of the HEIC on 10 February 1810 as the Madras Volunteer Battalion. Captain W. Munro, formerly of the 15th Regiment of Madras Native Infantry, was appointed to command of the battalion.

The authorised strength of the battalion at establishment was:
 Europeans: 1 Captain Commandant, 3 Captains, 10 Lieutenants, 5 Ensigns, 1 Adjutant, 1 Surgeon, 1 Assistant Surgeon, 1 Sergeant Major, 1 Quartermaster Sergeant

 Natives: 10 Subedars, 10 Jemadars, 50 Havildars, 50 Naiks, 900 Sepoys, 20 Drummers and Fifers, 12 Puckallies.

The battalion was renamed the Madras Rifle Corps in March 1814 and equipped with the Baker rifle. The battalion was highly distinguished in the Mahratta War of 1817–18.

In 1830, the battalion was broken up and individual rifle companies were attached to 1st, 5th, 16th, 24th, 26th, 36th, 38th and 49th regiments of Madras infantry. The separate rifle companies survived until 1869 when there were abolished.

References

British Indian Army infantry regiments
Military units and formations established in 1810
1869 disestablishments
Military history of the Madras Presidency
Honourable East India Company regiments
Madras Native Infantry